The FS Class E.330 was a small class of three-phase electric locomotive used in Italy, introduced in the 1910s.

History
In the late 1900s, the success of the three-phase electrification on mountain lines such as the Valtellina line, the  Simplon Tunnel and the  Giovi Pass line, led the newly formed Ferrovie dello Stato, under the direction of Riccardo Bianchi, to extend the electrification to other lines, where electric locomotives gave better performance. For the new lines to be electrified, three batches of electric locomotives were ordered, including the E.330 and the E.550 (a type E.551 was ordered but not built).

Unlike the previous electric locomotives used on mountain lines, the new locomotives had to be able to vary their speed, a capability which at the time was difficult to achieve, due to the fact that the three-phase motor spins at constant speed set by the feeding current frequency. The E.330 was designed to have four speeds (where the E.430 had only one and the contemporary E.550 two); this capability was obtained thanks to two patents by the German engineer Manu Stern and the Hungarian engineer Maurice Milch. The wheel arrangement chosen  was 1′C1′, similar to that adopted on the contemporary 685 class of steam locomotives.

The production contract was signed in 1913, construction of the new units beginning at  Società Italiana Westinghouse, which had designed the locomotive under the direction of Kálmán Kandó. The mechanical parts were co-built with Società Italiana Ernesto Breda. 

The locomotives were assigned to the Valtellina and Ligurian coast lines. The E.330s became operational in the Spring 1914. They were later used also in Lombardy on the local three-phase lines, until, from 1962, the railroads were adapted to the now standard 3,000 V direct current electrification.

All the E.330s were phased out during the 1960s.

References

1′C1′ locomotives
E.330
Railway locomotives introduced in 1914
Three-phase AC locomotives
Breda locomotives
Standard gauge locomotives of Italy